Murehwa North, also spelled Murewa North, is a constituency of the National Assembly of the Parliament of Zimbabwe, located in Mashonaland East Province. Its current MP since the 2018 election is Daniel Garwe of ZANU–PF.

References 

Mashonaland East Province
Parliamentary constituencies in Zimbabwe